Kuchyňa is a municipality in the Malacky District in the Bratislava Region of western Slovakia close to the town of Malacky, north-west of Slovakia's capital Bratislava. Nearby castle ruins of Kuchyňa Castle bear the name of the municipality.

The Kuchyňa airbase, often used by the US Air Force for training purposes, is located approximately 18 kilometers east of the city of Malacky.

See also
Kuchyňa Castle

References

External links

 Official page
https://web.archive.org/web/20070513023228/http://www.statistics.sk/mosmis/eng/run.html

Villages and municipalities in Malacky District